Aron Can (born 18 November 1999) is an Icelandic hip hop artist.

Biography 
Aron was born and raised in Grafarvogur, Reykjavík. His father is a Turkish restaurateur and Aron has worked in one of his kebab restaurants.

In 2016, at the age of 16, he released the mixtape Þekkir stráginn, with the song "Enginn mórall" becoming a hit. He was the most popular local artist on Spotify in Iceland in 2017.

His style has been described as emo rap influenced by Drake, Future, and Young Thug, and he is credited with popularizing the style in Iceland.

In 2018, he signed with Sony Music.

Albums 
 2016 – Þekkir stráginn.
 2017 – Ínótt.
 2018 – Trúpíter. Charted as the number one album in Iceland.
 2021 – ANDI, LÍF, HJARTA, SÁL.

Awards and nominations 
Aron was nominated for the Icelandic Music Awards in 2017 for the hip hop album of the year, hip hop song of the year, and as a rising star. The song "Silfurskotta" by Emmsjé Gauti and Aron Can won as the hip hop song of the year. He was again nominated in 2018 for hip hop album of the year and hip hop song of the year.

The music video for "Aldrei heim" of Trúpiter was selected as the music video of the year 2019 by the Icelandic Radio Listener's Awards.

Festivals 
Aron performed at the Reykjavík music festival Secret Solstice in 2016–2019, in the last of which he performed with the Black Eyed Peas.

He performed at Þjóðhátíð in Vestmannaeyjar in 2017.

Notes

References 

Icelandic rappers
Musicians from Reykjavík
Icelandic people of Turkish descent
1999 births
Living people